Diarsia serrata is a moth of the family Noctuidae. It is endemic to Borneo.

External links
Species info

Diarsia
Moths described in 1976